Actinium(III) oxide is a chemical compound containing the rare radioactive element actinium. It has the formula Ac2O3. It is similar to its corresponding lanthanum compound, lanthanum(III) oxide, and contains actinium in the oxidation state +3. Actinium oxide is not to be confused with Ac2O (acetic anhydride), where Ac is an abbreviation for acetyl instead of the symbol of the element actinium.

Reactions 
 Ac2O3 + 6HF → 2AcF3 + 3H2O
 Ac2O3 + 6HCl → 2AcCl3 + 3H2O
 4Ac(NO3)3 → 2Ac2O3 + 12NO2 + 3O2
 4Ac + 3O2 → 2Ac2O3
 Ac2O3 + 2AlBr3 → 2AcBr3 + Al2O3
 2Ac(OH)3 → Ac2O3 + 3H2O
 Ac2(C2O4)3 → Ac2O3 + 3CO2 + 3CO
 Ac2O3 + 3H2S → Ac2S3 + 3H2O

References 

Actinium compounds
Sesquioxides